Whitesburg may refer to a place in the United States:

 Whitesburg, Georgia
 Whitesburg, Kentucky
Whitesburg, Tennessee